Piatt County is a county in  Illinois. According to the 2020 United States Census, it had a population of 16,673. Its county seat is Monticello.

Piatt County is part of the Champaign–Urbana, IL Metropolitan Statistical Area.

History
The first settler was George Haworth, a Quaker, followed by James Martin, Abraham Hanline, Solomon Carter and William Cordell.

Piatt County was formed in 1841 from Macon and Dewitt counties. Two local residents, James A. Piatt and Jesse Warner, were instrumental in forming the county. It was named after James A. Piatt after winning a coin flip against Jesse Warner.

Abraham Lincoln practiced law in Piatt County as a circuit lawyer. Lincoln and Stephen A. Douglas planned their presidential debates in Piatt County in 1858, one of which is ornamented by a marker just south of Monticello.

The first courthouse was built in 1843. It was replaced by the current courthouse in 1904.

Geography

Climate and weather

Major highways

  Interstate 72
  Interstate 74
  U.S. Route 36
  U.S. Route 150
  Illinois Route 10
  Illinois Route 32
  Illinois Route 48
  Illinois Route 105

Adjacent counties

 McLean County - north
 Champaign County - east
 Douglas County - southeast
 Moultrie County - south
 Macon County - southwest
 De Witt County - west

Demographics

As of the 2010 United States Census, there were 16,729 people, 6,782 households, and 4,823 families residing in the county. The racial makeup of the county was 98.0% white, 0.3% black or African American, 0.3% Asian, 0.2% American Indian, 0.2% from other races, and 0.9% from two or more races. Those of Hispanic or Latino origin made up 1.0% of the population. In terms of ancestry, 26.1% were German, 21.9% were American, 15.2% were English, and 13.4% were Irish.

Of the 6,782 households, 32.0% had children under the age of 18 living with them, 59.4% were married couples living together, 8.0% had a female householder with no husband present, 28.9% were non-families, and 24.5% of all households were made up of individuals. The average household size was 2.46 and the average family size was 2.92. The median age was 42.6 years.

The median income for a household in the county was $55,752 and the median income for a family was $65,850. Males had a median income of $50,425 versus $32,304 for females. The per capita income for the county was $26,492. About 5.1% of families and 7.6% of the population were below the poverty line, including 10.8% of those under age 18 and 4.5% of those age 65 or over.

Communities

City
 Monticello (seat)

Villages

 Atwood (partial)
 Bement
 Cerro Gordo
 Cisco
 De Land
 Hammond
 Mansfield

Census-designated places
 La Place
 White Heath

Other unincorporated communities

 Amenia
 Galesville
 Lodge
 Milmine
 Pierson
 Voorhies

Former places

 Blue Ridge

Townships

 Bement
 Blue Ridge
 Cerro Gordo
 Goose Creek
 Monticello
 Sangamon
 Unity
 Willow Branch

Politics

See also
 National Register of Historic Places listings in Piatt County

References

 
Illinois counties
1841 establishments in Illinois
Populated places established in 1841